Borgognoni is an Italian surname that may refer to
Luciano Borgognoni (1951–2014), Italian cyclist
Theodoric Borgognoni (1205–1296/8), Italian surgeon

See also
Santi Claudio e Andrea dei Borgognoni, a Roman Catholic church in Rome, Italy

Italian-language surnames